Acraea chaeribula is a butterfly in the family Nymphalidae. It is found in southern Tanzania, Malawi, Zambia and the Democratic Republic of the Congo (Haut-Lomani, Lualaba, Haut-Shaba).

Description

A. chaeribula Oberth. (55 b) is very similar to certain forms of the next species [ Acraea acrita ] , only differing in the very large and deep black apical spot on the upperside of the forewing. Discal dots 3 to 6 of the forewing are absent and the marginal band of the hindwing is light-spotted. The ground-colour is in the male orange- yellow, in the female sometimes dull dark brown, only yellowish behind the cell of the forewing. Rhodesia, southern Congo, Nyassaland and German East Africa.

The habitat consists of Brachystegia woodland.( Miombo )

Taxonomy
Acraea chaeribula is a member of the Acraea acrita species group. The other clade members are:
 
Acraea chaeribula  
Acraea acrita
Acraea eltringhamiana
Acraea guluensis
Acraea lualabae
Acraea manca
Acraea pudorina 
Acraea utengulensis

Classification of Acraea by Henning, Henning & Williams, Pierre. J. & Bernaud

Acraea (group acrita) Henning, 1993 
Acraea (Rubraea) Henning & Williams, 2010 
Acraea (Acraea) (subgroup acrita) Pierre & Bernaud, 2013 
Acraea (Acraea)  Groupe egina Pierre & Bernaud, 2014

References

External links

Die Gross-Schmetterlinge der Erde 13: Die Afrikanischen Tagfalter. Plate XIII 55 b

Butterflies described in 1893
chaeribula
Butterflies of Africa